The 1994–95 FA Premier League (known as the FA Carling Premiership for sponsorship reasons) was the third season of the Premier League, the top division of professional football in England.

Overview

Transfers
Just before the start of the season, the English transfer record was broken when Blackburn Rovers paid £5 million for 21-year-old Norwich City striker Chris Sutton. But that record was broken again in January when Manchester United paid £6 million for Newcastle United's Andy Cole, in a deal which also saw £1 million-rated Keith Gillespie move to Newcastle. Other significant transfers before and during the 1994–95 season included: Vinny Samways (Tottenham to Everton, £2 million), David Rocastle (Manchester City to Chelsea, £1.25 million), Jürgen Klinsmann (Monaco to Tottenham Hotspur, £2 million), John Scales (Wimbledon to Liverpool, £3 million) and Paul Kitson (Derby County to Newcastle United, £2.2 million).

Summary
The title was won by Blackburn Rovers, whose last title success was in 1914, and also was Blackburn's first major trophy in 67 years (the last being 1927–28 FA Cup).	
Kenny Dalglish's side secured the championship on the last day of the season despite losing 2–1 at his former club Liverpool, as Manchester United could only manage a 1–1 draw at West Ham.	
This meant that Blackburn Rovers qualified for the European Cup for the first time in their history, while Manchester United finished second earning a UEFA Cup place. A single point separated the two sides, who for more than half of the season enjoyed a wide gap in terms of point between themselves and the rest of the league, despite the likes of Nottingham Forest, Liverpool and Newcastle United briefly topping the league during the first three months of the season.

Also qualifying for the UEFA Cup were Nottingham Forest (who finished third in their first season back in the Premier League), Liverpool (who finished fourth and won their fifth League Cup in the club's first full season following the appointment of Roy Evans) and fifth placed Leeds United.

The number of teams in the league for the following year would be reduced to 20. This was to be achieved by increasing the number of teams facing relegation to four, and reducing the number of teams being promoted from Division 1 to two.

Controversial incidents
In January 1995, Manchester United's 28-year-old French striker Eric Cantona (then holder of the PFA Players' Player of the Year award) assaulted a Crystal Palace fan who racially abused him in his team's 1–1 draw at Selhurst Park. Cantona was banned from football for eight months, fined £20,000 and sentenced to 14 days in prison. The prison sentence was later reduced to 120 hours community service on appeal.

Chelsea midfielder Dennis Wise was convicted of criminal damage and assault, relating to a fight with a taxi driver in London. He was given a three-month prison sentence but the conviction and prison sentence were quickly overturned on appeal.

Arsenal midfielder Paul Merson admitted in November 1994 that he was an alcoholic and was also addicted to cocaine and gambling. He underwent a three-month drug rehabilitation programme before being allowed to resume his playing career.

Crystal Palace striker Chris Armstrong failed a drugs test in February 1995 but admitted that he had done wrong and returned to action after just four weeks undergoing rehabilitation. Armstrong was Palace's leading goalscorer in 1994–95, helping them reach the semi finals of both domestic cup competitions, but was unable to prevent them from being relegated back to the First Division just one season after winning promotion.

Arsenal manager George Graham was sacked in February 1995 after nearly nine years in charge, when it was revealed that he had accepted an illegal payment of £425,000 from Norwegian agent Rune Hauge relating to the purchases of Norwegian and Danish players Pål Lydersen and John Jensen three years earlier. Graham was later banned from football for one year by the FA.

Teams
Twenty-two teams competed in the league – the top nineteen teams from the previous season and the three teams promoted from the First Division. The promoted teams were Crystal Palace, Nottingham Forest (both teams returning to the top flight after a season's absence) and Leicester City (returning after a top flight absence of seven years). This was also Leicester City's first season in the Premier League. They replaced Sheffield United, Oldham Athletic and Swindon Town, ending their top flight spells of four, three and one year respectively. This was the final season with twenty-two teams as all seasons after this one have twenty teams.

Stadiums and locations

Personnel and kits
(as of 14 May 1995)

Managerial changes

League table

Results

Season statistics

Scoring

Top scorers

Hat-tricks 

Note: 5 Player scored 5 goals; (H) – Home; (A) – Away

Top assists

Awards

Monthly awards

Annual awards

See also 
 1994–95 in English football

References and notes

External links
League and cup results for all the 1994/95 Premier Division clubs at footballsite
1994–95 Premier League Season at RSSSF
1994–95 League statistics from RSSSF

 
Premier League seasons
Eng
1994–95 in English football leagues